Pseudapis oxybeloides is a species of bee in the genus Pseudapis, of the family Halictidae. It is a soil nesting type of bee. It is known to be a major insect pollinator in the world.

References

 http://www.atlashymenoptera.net/biblio/Karunaratne_et_al_2006_Sri_Lanka.pdf
 https://www.itis.gov/servlet/SingleRpt/SingleRpt?search_topic=TSN&search_value=764654
 https://www.academia.edu/7390502/AN_UPDATED_CHECKLIST_OF_BEES_OF_SRI_LANKA_WITH_NEW_RECORDS
 http://animaldiversity.org/accounts/Pseudapis_oxybeloides/classification/
 http://www.discoverlife.org/mp/20q?search=Pseudapis+oxybeloides
 https://www.researchgate.net/publication/308199370_Diagnostics_of_a_lesser_known_halictine_bee_Pseudapis_oxybeloides_Smith_Halictidae_Nomiinae_from_India

Halictidae
Hymenoptera of Asia
Insects of Sri Lanka
Insects described in 1875